Lethality is an extended play by South Korean singer Kwon Eun-bi. The album consists of six songs including the lead single, "Underwater". It was released digitally and physically on October 12, 2022, by Woollim Entertainment and distributed by Kakao Entertainment.

Background
On September 20, with a poster, Kwon announced her comeback with her third mini album, Lethality, which was released on October 12, around six months after her second EP, Color. The teaser image was released on September 23 while the scheduler was released on September 24. The concept photos 1 and 2 were released on September 28 and 30 respectively. The track list was released on October 3. The third and fourth concept photo were released on October 5 and 7 respectively.

Track listing

Charts

Weekly charts

Monthly charts

Release history

References

2022 EPs
Korean-language EPs
Kwon Eun-bi EPs
Woollim Entertainment EPs